Ronald M. Clowes, CM is a professor specializing in seismic and other geophysical studies of the Earth's lithosphere. For his work he has been appointed a member of the Order of Canada.

He completed three degrees while attending the University of Alberta; B.Sc. (1964), M.Sc. (1966), Ph.D. (1969). In 1969–1970, Clowes completed an NRC postdoctoral fellowship at Australian National University. He became a professor at the University of British Columbia in 1970. In 1987, he became the director of Lithoprobe, a national geoscience research project. Clowes continues to teach at UBC as a professor in the Department of Earth and Ocean Sciences. His research, with colleagues and students, focuses on seismic and other geophysical studies of the Earth’s lithosphere; and relation of the results to geology and tectonics.

Awards 
2005- Logan Medal, Geological Association of Canada’s highest honour
2004–2006- Canada Council Killam Research Fellowship
2002- Queen Elizabeth II Golden Jubilee Medal
1998- Member, Order of Canada  
1998- J. Tuzo Wilson Medal, Canadian Geophysical Union 
1997- Distinguished Lecturer Award, The Canadian Institute of Mining, Metallurgy and Petroleum 
1995- Honorary member, Canadian Society of Exploration Geophysicists 
1995- Distinguished fellow, Geological Association of Canada 
1994- Fellow, Royal Society of Canada 
1993- George P. Woollard Award, Geological Society of America 
1988- Past President`s Medal, Geological Association of Canada  
1987-88- Canada Council Killam Research Fellowship (declined); 
1966, 1981- Best Paper Award, Canadian Society of Exploration Geophysicists
1968- Best Paper Award, Geophysics

External links
 University of British Columbia Faculty Bio
  Abstract - Comparison of lithospheric structures across the Alaskan and Canadian Cordillera

References

Living people
Canadian geologists
Fellows of the Royal Society of Canada
Members of the Order of Canada
Wilson Medal recipients
University of Alberta alumni
Academic staff of the University of British Columbia
Logan Medal recipients
Year of birth missing (living people)